This is the discography from the Estonian singer Maarja Kivi.

Discography

Albums 
 2008: Payback Time 
 2015  Land of Dreams  (EP)

Singles

Other songs 
 2002: A Dream Song from the Eurolaul 2002

References

Discographies of Estonian artists